Potassium polonide is a chemical compound with the formula K2Po. It is a polonide, a set of very chemically stable compounds of polonium.

Characteristics
Potassium polonide is thermally more unstable and has stronger electron affinity than potassium telluride (K2Te).

Production
Potassium polonide may be produced from a redox reaction between hydrogen polonide and potassium metal:

H2Po + 2 K → K2Po + H2

It may also be produced by heating potassium and polonium together at 300–400 °C. At higher temperature, this reaction may reverse.

Crystal structure
Like sodium polonide, potassium polonide has the antifluorite structure.

References

Polonides
Potassium compounds
Fluorite crystal structure